Then Came the Night is the only studio album of American country music artist Tommy Shane Steiner, released in 2002 on RCA Nashville. It features the single "What If She's an Angel", a number 2 hit for Steiner on the Hot Country Songs charts in late 2001-early 2002. Both the second and third singles — "Tell Me Where It Hurts" and "What We're Gonna Do About It", respectively — peaked at number 43 on the same chart.

The track "The Mind of John J. Blanchard" was later recorded by Anthony Smith under the title "John J. Blanchard" on his 2002 debut album If That Ain't Country, from which it was released as a single that year.  "I Go Crazy" is a cover of pop singer Paul Davis's hit from 1978.

Jimmy Ritchey produced the album, with Frank Liddell serving as associate producer on tracks 2 and 5.

Critical reception
Stephen Thomas Erlewine of Allmusic gave the album 3 stars out of 5, calling it "a mainstream pop album with a little bit of country dressing" and saying that Steiner is "a modest, likeable singer." Mark Marymont of Country Weekly praised "What If She's an Angel" as "sweetly sentimental", and saying that he "adds a new emotional dimension" to "I Go Crazy". Ray Waddell of Billboard gave the album a mostly-negative review, criticizing it as "devoid of substance" and calling the title track "pretentious", while calling "The Mind of John J. Blanchard" "well-written and even quite moving".

Track listing

Personnel
Kenny Aronoff – drums
Lisa Cochran – background vocals
Eric Darken – percussion
Chip Davis – background vocals
Paul Franklin – pedal steel guitar, lap steel guitar
Vince Gill – background vocals ("What If She's an Angel")
David Grissom – electric guitar
Aubrey Haynie – fiddle, mandolin
Wes Hightower – background vocals
David Huff – drum programming
Paul Leim – drums
B. James Lowry – acoustic guitar
John Mabe – background vocals
Liana Manis – background vocals
Brent Mason – electric guitar
Richie McDonald – background vocals ("Havin' a Good Time")
Steve Nathan – keyboards
Michael Rhodes – bass guitar
Jimmy Ritchey – acoustic guitar, banjo, Dobro, harmonica, mandolin, electric guitar, 5-string banjo, nylon-string guitar
Neil Thrasher – background vocals
Lonnie Wilson – drums
Curtis Wright – background vocals
Jonathan Yudkin – violin, viola, cello

Chart performance

References

[ Then Came the Night] at Allmusic
Tommy Shane Steiner biography at About.com

2002 debut albums
RCA Records albums
Tommy Shane Steiner albums
Albums produced by Jimmy Ritchey